Turricula thurstoni is a species of sea snail, a marine gastropod mollusk in the family Clavatulidae.

Description
The length of the shell attains 40 mm, its diameter 13 mm.

The white shell has a fusiform shape. It contains 10 whorls.

The shell resembles Turricula javana. The nodules at the periphery are rather similar, but the fine sutural plicae are wanting in P. javana.

Distribution
This marine species occurs off India and Sri Lanka.

References

 E. A. Smith (1896), Ann. & Mag. Nat. Hist., ser. 6, vol. 18, p. 369

thurstoni
Gastropods described in 1896